Michael Woythe (born 15 November 1957 in Berlin) is a German football manager and former player.

Woythe made a total of 18 2. Fußball-Bundesliga appearances in the late 1970s for SC Wacker 04 Berlin and SG Wattenscheid 09.

References 
 

1957 births
Living people
Footballers from Berlin
German footballers
Association football midfielders
SG Wattenscheid 09 players
Tennis Borussia Berlin players
Hertha Zehlendorf players
German football managers
2. Bundesliga players